Irina Valeryevna Rukavishnikova (born 3 February 1973) is a Russian politician serving as a senator from Rostov Oblast since 15 September 2018.

Biography
Irina Rukavishnikova was born on 3 February 1973 in Rostov-on-Don. In 1995, she graduated from Rostov State University. Three years later, Rukavishnikova also defended a doctoral degree at Rostov State University. From 1995 to 1997, she worked as an instructor at the Rostov State University of Economics. From 1997 to 2005, she was the Deputy Dean of the Faculty of Law of the Rostov State Economic University. In 2006 she was appointed Dean of the Faculty of Law of the Rostov State Economic University. From 2013 to 2018, Rukavishnikova was the deputy of the Legislative Assembly of Rostov Oblast of the 5th and 6th convocations. On 15 September 2018, she became a senator after deputies from the Legislative Assembly of Rostov Oblast nominated her.

Sanctions
Rukavishnikova was sanctioned by the European Union, the United Kingdom, the United States, and other states, for supporting Russia's annexation of Ukrainian territories.

References

Living people
1973 births
United Russia politicians
21st-century Russian politicians
People from Rostov-on-Don
Members of the Federation Council of Russia (after 2000)